Hengshan is a station on the Taoyuan Airport MRT located in Dayuan District, Taoyuan City, Taiwan. It opened for commercial service on 2 March 2017.

This elevated station has two side platforms and two tracks. Only Commuter trains stop at this station. It opened for trial service on February 2, 2017, and for commercial service March 2, 2017.

It will be a future transfer station with the Green line (G18) of Taoyuan Metro.

Construction on the station began on September 18, 2008, and opened for commercial service on March 2, 2017 with the opening of the Taipei-Huanbei section of the Airport MRT.

Around the Station
Kaguo Ranch (卡果牧場) (1km northeast of the station)

Haifeng Park (1km southwest of the station)

Dayuan Da-Hai Park (2.4km northeast of the station)

Taoyuan Calla Lily Festival (2.4km southwest of the station)

Xihai Pond Ecology Park (2.8km southwest of the station)

Exits
Exit 1: Dazhu South Road

See also
 Taoyuan Metro

References

Railway stations opened in 2017
2017 establishments in Taiwan
Taoyuan Airport MRT stations